The Center for Asymmetric Warfare (CAW) was established in 1999. CAW is a U.S. Navy entity dedicated to supporting U.S. military forces, as well as local, state, and federal organizations, in countering and controlling the effects of asymmetric warfare, and in support of the Global War on Terrorism. Their focus is on training & education, technology evaluation and the execution of complex, multi-agency exercises, expanding on our maritime/port security heritage.

Naval Postgraduate School 
In 2008, the CAW joined the Naval Postgraduate School as a satellite division, located at NAS Point Mugu, CA and is aligned under the Research Department. As part of the Research Department, the CAW has the flexibility to operate across the 4 institutes and 4 schools that make up NPS. It also allows the CAW to capitalize on the expertise of their many distinguished alumni, faculty and students that can perform as interns.

CAW capabilities 
Training: Recognized subject matter experts develop and deliver a wide variety of student-based training courses, including the National Incident Management System (NIMS), the Incident Command System (ICS) and Defense Support of Civil authorities (DSCA). The CAW also provides training in specific areas of the exercise design process, such as, identification of exercise requirements and development of the Exercise Master Scenario Events List (MSEL).
Exercise Design Facilitation of multiple and diverse response and support agencies with different operational characteristics and cultures to identify the procedural, physical and logistics needs for the successful execution of the exercise. This leads to the development of complex but realistic scenario-based challenges that meet the goals and objectives of the participating agencies.
Exercise Delivery Management of the exercise activities, including set up of the environment, conducting and controlling exercise activities preventing peripheral events from disrupting the exercise, and facilitating participating agencies' responses to the scenario events for capturing lessons learned and best practices.
Exercise Documentation The CAW is experienced in producing the full spectrum of exercise documentation including training, design, control, execution, instructional aides, and after action documents.
Resources Personnel, products, and/or locations that enhance the realism of the scenario and the learning experience, ranging from:
Simulated weapons and explosives
Large scale props such as ships, aircraft and buildings
Opposition forces
Simulated casualties
Contaminated victims
Video production to support the exercise scenario or capture and document exercise activities
Press/media representatives
Fast Patrol Craft, CAW-1

External links
 Naval Postgraduate School

Naval Postgraduate School
United States Navy